Kari Bingen is an American policy analyst and government official who served as Principal Deputy Under Secretary of Defense for Intelligence, the second-highest ranking civilian intelligence job in The Pentagon. She was confirmed unanimously by the U.S. Senate on May 25, 2017 and sworn in on June 5, 2017. According to a Pentagon spokesman, Bingen resigned on December 5, 2019 and will leave the Pentagon on January 10, 2020. The spokesman added that this is a normal rotation.

Bingen is a former staff member of the United States House Committee on Armed Services (HASC), where she served on the strategic forces subcommittee and as the HASC's policy director. Prior to her work with the federal government, Bingen was a senior space policy analyst at The Aerospace Corporation and an engineer at SRA International.

References

External links

Living people
Massachusetts Institute of Technology alumni
Trump administration personnel
United States Under Secretaries of Defense
American women of Japanese descent in politics
Year of birth missing (living people)
21st-century American women